True Parallels is the second studio album by American alternative metal band Trust Company. Originally to be released in 2004, the release date was pushed back to March 21, 2005, internationally and on March 22, 2005, in the United States. Despite little promotion from their label, the album entered the Billboard album charts at number 32 and has gone on to sell in excess of 200,000 copies.

Background 
Trust Company was originally scheduled to play at Ozzfest 2003, but canceled to focus on finishing True Parallels. Several months prior to the album's release, original bassist Josh Moates left the group and was replaced by Walker Warren.

"Stronger" was released in February 2005 as the album's single. It has two versions for the music videos, the original version features the band performing at a party. The video was unreleased until it was uploaded in May 2017 by former bassist Walker Warren and was later posted on Trust Company's Facebook page, the MTV2 version which received moderate airplay, features the band performing in a skatepark. According to drummer Jason Singleton on the band's message board, "The War is Over" gained much popularity within the World of Warcraft film-making community and was considered for a second single.

When they were known as 41Down, the track that bore the title of this album was later remade for their album The Lonely Position of Neutral as the track "Falling Apart".

Track listing

Personnel 
Credits adapted from the CD liner notes.

TRUSTcompany 
 James Fukai – guitar, background vocals, producer (13), mixing (13), art direction
 Kevin Palmer – guitar, vocals, producer (13), mixing (13), art direction
 Jason Singleton – drums, background vocals, producer (13), mixing (13), art direction
 Josh Moates – bass (3–12), art direction
Chris Cheney – bass (1 & 2)

Technical 

 Ted Jensen – mastering at Sterling Sound, New York City
 Jordan Schur – executive producer
 Jason Harter for i-psyte Design – art direction

Tracks 1 & 2 
 Howard Benson – producer, keyboards, programming
 Mike Plotnikoff – engineer
 Eric Miller – additional engineering
 Paul Decarli – Pro Tools editing
 Chris Lord-Alge – mixing at Image Recording Studio, Hollywood, CA
 Dmitar Kmjaic – mixing assistant
 Gersh – drum tech
 Keith Nelson – guitar tech
 Doug Robb – background vocals (1)

Tracks 3–12 

 Don Gilmore – producer, engineer, mixing at NRG Recording Studios, North Hollywood, CA
 John Ewing Jr. - engineer
 Fox Phelps – 2nd engineer
 Jeffrey Rabhan – additional percussion (4–10)

Track 13 

 James Uertz – engineer, mixing
 Layla Palmer – background vocals

Charts 
Album – Billboard (United States)

Singles – Billboard (United States)

Appearances 
"Stronger" was featured in the video game MX vs. ATV Unleashed in 2005. It was also the theme song to a WWE pay-per-view at Backlash 2005.
"Surfacing" was featured in the video game MVP Baseball 2004 by EA Sports.

References 

Trust Company (band) albums
2005 albums